Lucien Élie Largé (15 April 1874 – 14 February 1902) was a French fencer. He competed in the men's masters foil event at the 1900 Summer Olympics.

References

External links
 

1874 births
1902 deaths
French male foil fencers
Olympic fencers of France
Fencers at the 1900 Summer Olympics
Fencers from Paris